Olive Griffith Stull (Davis) (February 10, 1905 – June 15, 1969) was an American herpetologist.

Stull was born in Rochester, New York. She married Loy Davis in 1930, one year after completing her degree at the University of Michigan. She worked in the field of veterinary medicine and contributed to research in a variety of fields. Her appointments included fellowships at Harvard's Museum of Comparative Zoology and at her alma mater, where she was a student of Alexander Grant Ruthven. She published an important revision of the colubrid snake genus Pituophis, and is the author of the species Pituophis ruthveni whose name honours her professor at Michigan.  In a review of her revision in Copeia, Klauber was critical of her indiscriminate acceptance of reported localities of specimens in the genus.

Stull also described a subspecies, Python curtus brongersmai, a commercially harvested snake of the Malay peninsula, which has since been reclassified as a distinct species Python brongersmai. She conducted research in a variety of other areas, most notably into the physiology and distribution of snakes. Her works include papers on the taxonomy of Serpentes and she is the author of descriptions of many species. She was later employed as an agent of the USDA to investigate the diseases of poultry and avian leukosis.

The abbreviation Stull is used in zoological nomenclature for citations of this author.

References

External links
The Michigan Alumnus, with mentions of Stull's dates of birth and death

American herpetologists
American taxonomists
1905 births
1969 deaths
Herpetologists
Women zoologists
Women taxonomists
University of Michigan alumni
University of Michigan faculty
Harvard University staff
20th-century American zoologists
20th-century American women scientists
American women academics